Nils Eberhard Hjalmar von Hofsten (13 September 1828 – 12 March 1912), was a Swedish politician.

Life and work 
Nils von Hofsten was born on September 13, 1828, at Valåsen Manor, Karlskoga, Sweden, and was the third of five children of Erland and Johanna von Hofsten (née Nordenfeldt). His father was an ironmaster at Valåsen Works.

Von Hofsten was a member of the Riksdag of the Estates 1865–1866, and of the Första kammaren 1867–1875.

Von Hofsten married Countess Anna Fredrika Sparre af Söfdeborg.

References 

1828 births
1912 deaths
People from Karlskoga Municipality
Swedish nobility
19th-century Swedish politicians
Nils